Taphurini is a tribe of cicadas in the family Cicadidae, found in the neotropics.

Genera
These genera belong to the tribe Taphurini:

 Anopercalna Boulard, 2008 c g
 Chalumalna Boulard, 1998 i c g
 Dorachosa Distant, 1892 i c g
 Dulderana Distant, 1905 i c g
 Elachysoma Torres, 1964 i c g
 Imbabura Distant, 1911 i c g
 Malloryalna Sanborn, 2016 c g
 Nosola Stål, 1866 i c g
 Prosotettix Jacobi, 1907 i c g
 Psallodia Uhler, 1903 i c g
 Taphura Stål, 1862 i c g

Data sources: i = ITIS, c = Catalogue of Life, g = GBIF, b = Bugguide.net

References

Further reading

External links

 

 
Cicadettinae
Hemiptera tribes